Dora the Explorer Party Favorites (also knows as Dora the Explorer Party Favorites) is a compilation of classic children's songs sung by Dora the Explorer (Caitlin Sanchez). It includes a remix of Dora's theme song. The CD also comes with a "Pin the Boots on Boots" game.

Track listing

Special features
 Includes  a "Pin the Boots on Boots!" game.

References

2008 soundtrack albums
Television soundtracks